Ada Konstantia Nilsson (September 21, 1872 – May 23, 1964) was an early  Swedish woman doctor. She was one of the founders of the campaigning magazine Tidevarvet in 1923.

Biography
Nilsson was born in Södra Säms in 1872. She was brought up in a farmhouse. Her father who helped to run the cottage textile workers died when she was thirteen and she went to live in Stockholm. In 1891 she was one of the first women to take medical training, initially in Uppsala and mainly in Stockholm. She met Lydia Wahlström and Alma Sundquist who were pioneers, too.

She was a member of the Liberal Women's National Association.

The magazine Tidevarvet was founded in 1923 by Kerstin Hesselgren, Honorine Hermelin, who was an educator, Ada Nilsson, Elisabeth Tamm, a liberal politician, and Elin Wägner, who was an author. The founders who had a liberal political stance were known as the Fogelstad group. Nilsson was one of the principal funders of the project and became editor-in-chief with her new friend Elin Wägner as its first editor. The magazine was to publish until 1936 and for three years (1925-28) the magazine ran a free consultancy but it was difficult to fund.

Death and private life
Nilsson had a very close relationship with Honorine Hermelin. During the last year of her life Nilsson went to stay at Fogelstad with Hermelin. She was near blind and poor. She was buried in a cemetery near her birthplace. Her life is one of those celebrated in Stockholm's Östermalmstorg metro station by Siri Derkert.

References

External links
 Swedish encyclopedia
 Swedish encyclopedia
 Digital Archive
 Libris

Further reading
 

20th-century Swedish women politicians
20th-century Swedish politicians
1872 births
1964 deaths
Swedish feminists
Swedish gynaecologists
Swedish magazine founders
Women gynaecologists